is a Japanese actor. He won the award for best actor at the 31st Yokohama Film Festival for The Wonderful World of Captain Kuhio and The Chef of South Polar and the award for best supporting actor at the 2008 Nikkan Sports Film Award, at the 33rd Hochi Film Award and at the 51st Blue Ribbon Awards. He also received a nomination for best supporting actor at the 32nd Japan Academy Prize. He is married to Japanese actress and J-pop singer Miho Kanno.

On August 14, 2015, he announced the birth of his first son.

Filmography

Film

Television

Animation
Yukikaze (2002-2005 OVA) Rei Fukai
Aoi Bungaku (2009) Youzou, Shigemaru, Sensei, Melos, Yoshihide, Presenter
Promare (2019) Kray Foresight

Theater
Honmoku Macbeth (1995)
Kozak (1995) 
Vibe (1996)
The Soul of Orange (1997)
The Taste of Water (1998)
Zenmai (1998)Beautiful Sunday (2000)Vamp Show (2001)Father's Love Story: A Family Tale (2005)The Man in the Rumors (2006)The Fearless Troupe of Kawakami Otojiro (2007)Ban'yuuki (2009)

DubbingChristopher Robin'', Christopher Robin (Ewan McGregor)

References

External links
IMDb - Masato Sakai

1973 births
Living people
Japanese male actors
People from Miyazaki Prefecture
Taiga drama lead actors